The Ladak pika (Ochotona ladacensis), also known as the Ladakh pika, is a species of mammal in the family Ochotonidae found in China, India, and Pakistan. Prior to identification as a separate species, specimens were thought to be of the plateau pika.

Taxonomy
Specimens of the Ladak pika were originally identified as plateau pika due to their color and the similarities in the narrow interorbital region on the skull of each species. However, differences were found between the two including the smaller auditory bulla found in the Ladak pika and a differently arched skull shape. There are no subspecies of the Ladak pika. Local names in the Ladakhi language include zabra, karin, and phisekarin.

Description
The fur of the Ladak pika is a light brown/grey with a yellow/white underside. The outside areas of the ears are a color reminiscent of rust. The skull has a high arch. They reproduce during late June and early July.

Habitat
The Ladak pika is found in the mountain ranges of northern India, northeastern Pakistan, and western China including the provinces of Qinghai, Xizang and Xinjiang, as well as across the Tibetan Plateau. They are herbivorous and are thought to eat roots throughout the winter such as those of the family Primulaceae. The Ladak pika lives in territorial family groups. They have been recorded as being commonly found during surveys in these regions.

References

Pikas
Mammals of Pakistan
Mammals of India
Mammals of Tibet
Mammals described in 1875
Taxa named by Albert Günther
Taxonomy articles created by Polbot